The Front for Democracy in Burundi (FRODEBU) is a Hutu progressive political party in Burundi.

History 

It was formed by followers of Melchior Ndadaye from the disbanded Burundi Workers' Party in 1986. FRODEBU was legalized as a political party in 1992.

In 1993, FRODEBU won power in Burundi and put forward a Hutu president, Melchior Ndadaye. The election of a Hutu government triggered violence between Hutu and Tutsi militias, and President Ndadaye was assassinated. In retaliation, some 25,000 Tutsis were killed. The Tutsis responded with an outbreak of violence against Hutus and killed civilians in retaliation. The violence was on a smaller scale than the mass genocide occurring in Rwanda where Hutu were massacring Tutsis and moderate Hutus.

By mid-1994, FRODEBU had been severely crippled by a loss of leadership; of its 11-strong central committee prior to the 1993 elections, by that point only Sylvestre Ntibantunganya remained active with the party in Burundi. Six of the committee members had been killed, while the remainder had fled into exile.

In the legislative 2005 parliamentary election, the party won 21.7% of the vote and 30 out of 118 seats, becoming the main opposition party.

FRODEBU suspended its participation in the National Assembly on 21 February 2008 to protest efforts by the National Council for the Defense of Democracy-Forces for the Defense of Democracy (CNDD/FDD) to remove Alice Nzomukunda, a former CNDD/FDD member, from her post as vice-president of the National Assembly.

FRODEBU is a consultative member of the Socialist International.

Electoral history

Presidential elections

National Assembly elections

Senate elections

References

1986 establishments in Burundi
Democratic socialist parties in Africa
Formerly banned socialist parties
Former member parties of the Socialist International
Political parties established in 1986
Political parties in Burundi
Socialism in Burundi